Deriche is a surname. Notable people with the name include:

 Mohamed Deriche (1865-1948), Algerian politician
 Lyès Deriche (1932-1982), Algerian politician
 Rachid Deriche (1954-), Algerian scientist
 , Algerian politician
 , Algerian artist
 , Algerian scientist
 Deriche edge detector, digital image operator
 , Algerian company